The Council of Ministers of the Hungarian People's Republic was the cabinet of Hungary during the era of Communist rule. It was created in 1949, with the enactment of a new constitution that formally created the People's Republic of Hungary. Along with the state itself, it was abolished in 1989.

The Council of Ministers consisted of the Chairman (Prime Minister), deputy chairmen, ministers of state, head of ministries and the Chairman of the National Planning Board. The Parliament of Hungary, upon the recommendation of the Presidential Council of the Hungarian People's Republic, elected and relieved the chairman and ministers of their duties.

List of Chairmen 

Government of Hungary
1949 establishments in Hungary
1989 disestablishments in Hungary